Me is the debut EP by American singer RaeLynn, released on January 13, 2015.

Track listing

Chart performance

References

2015 EPs
RaeLynn EPs
Big Machine Records EPs
Albums produced by Joey Moi